Sally4Ever is a British comedy television series created by Julia Davis. The series stars Davis, Catherine Shepherd and Alex MacQueen. It premiered in the United Kingdom on Sky Atlantic on 25 October 2018, and in the United States on HBO on 11 November 2018.

In 2019, the series won the BAFTA for Best Scripted Comedy.

It ran for only one season.

Cast and characters

 Julia Davis as Emma
 Catherine Shepherd as Sally
 Alex Macqueen as David
 Julian Barratt as Nigel 
 Felicity Montagu as Elanor
 Steve Oram as Mick
 Jane Stanness as Deborah
 Georgie Glen as Pat 
 Vicki Pepperdine as Belinda 
 Lena Headey as herself 
 Sean Bean as himself

Development and production
Sally4Ever was given a seven-episode order by Sky Atlantic and HBO in May 2018. Sky Atlantic released the trailer for the series on 5 October 2018.

Release
The series premiered on 25 October 2018 on Sky Atlantic at 10 pm, and on 11 November 2018 on HBO at 10:30 pm. It was made available for streaming on Now TV in the UK.

In Canada, it premiered on HBO on 11 November 2018 at 10:30 pm. It premiered in Australia on Fox Showcase on 5 February 2019 at 7:30 pm.

Reception
The season received a 97% approval rating on review aggregator Rotten Tomatoes with an average rating of 7.75/10. Metacritic gave it an average score of 77 out of 100, indicating "Generally favorable reviews".

Sally4Ever was praised by Sean O'Grady of The Independent as "brilliant, but more than usually disturbing", describing the sex scene between Emma and Sally in the pilot episode as "Pervy, kinky, gruesome, cringey" and "one of Davis' finest scenes yet". In The Guardian, Lucy Mangan gave it four stars and applauded Julia Davis for fashioning "another wholly sadistic half hour that leaves the viewer skewered and writhing in exquisite agony".

Episodes

References

External links
  (Sky Atlantic)
  (HBO)
 Sally4Ever on Now TV
 

2018 British television series debuts
2018 British television series endings
2010s British comedy television series
2010s British LGBT-related comedy television series
2010s British LGBT-related television series
English-language television shows
Lesbian-related television shows
Television shows set in England
HBO original programming
Sky Atlantic original programming
BAFTA winners (television series)